Hyposmocoma ipohapuu is a species of moth of the family Cosmopterigidae. It is known only from Volcano Village on Hawaii. It is probably restricted to the rainforest areas around Hawaii Volcanoes National Park.

Adults have a forewing pattern that differs from any other described species in the genus Hyposmocoma. It consists of a wide pale yellow band along the anal margin of the forewing, curving proximally at the wing margin towards the costa. There is a small, round, dark brown mark present approximately two thirds of the way from the wing base to the apex.

The case widens slightly at both ends. Case-making larvae were collected on the abaxial surface of old fronds of Cibotium glaucum. The habit of residing in old tree fern fronds, still attached to the stump, is typical of several purse case species including Hyposmocoma filicivora.

Etymology
The species is named ipohapuu, which means tree-fern lover in Hawaiian.

References

ipohapuu
Endemic moths of Hawaii
Moths described in 2012